Hoke L. Smith (May 7, 1931 – March 27, 2004) was the tenth president of Towson University.

Early in Dr. Smith's administration, he focused on Towson's status as a "comprehensive university." One of the first changes was the a new governance structure and the establishment of six colleges. With public higher education seriously under-funded, Dr. Smith set out to strengthen alumni and development programs as a source of alternative funding.

During his administration, Towson added 20 new undergraduate programs, 19 new graduate programs and the 3 doctoral programs. In 1997, Smith led Towson to its latest name change to Towson University.

On Saturday March 27, 2004, Smith died of liver cancer at his home in Baltimore. He was 72.

External links
Presidential Biographies - Towson Archives

Presidents of Towson University
1931 births
2004 deaths
20th-century American academics